Pyrosejidae is a family of mites in the order Mesostigmata.

Taxonomy
 Pyroseiulus
 Pyroseiulus kethleyi
 Pyrosejus
 Pyrosejus prionotus
 Pyrosejus verticis

References

Mesostigmata
Acari families